Decarthria albofasciata is a species of beetle in the family Cerambycidae. It was described by Gahan in 1895. It is known from Grenada.

References

Cyrtinini
Beetles described in 1895